PTV Global is a Pakistani basic cable and satellite television channel by Pakistan Television Corporation that is aired nationwide as well as in Europe and United States. Its broadcasts selected programming from PTV Home, PTV National, PTV News and other PTV-run networks. On air since April 2006, PTV Global is available via Dish Network in the US. Part of the Pakistan Television Corporation brand name, it is under control of the Government of Pakistan. In the United Kingdom PTV Global is free-to-air on Sky Channel 735 and also in Mainland Europe on Astra 2G.

Programmes
 Ghar Damad
 Rising Pakistan
 Bewaja
 Tootay Pattay
 Morning at Home
 Signature Tune
 Satrangia
 Al-Quran Ul Hakeem
 Al-Quran Sabaq
 Khabarnama
 Sufi Rang
 Rent a Bhoot
 Sunehray Geet
 Tele Film
 Young Tarang

PTV in the UK
PTV Global was launched on Sky Channel 810 in 2007. It commenced its transmissions on 2 April 2007.

PTV in USA
PTV Global was launched in 2006. It is one of the nine channels of the PTV Network. It commenced its transmission for the United States on 22 April 2006 and for the United Kingdom on 2 April 2007.

PTV Global beams its transmission from Islamabad, Pakistan on AsiaSat-35, and is viewed in over 50 countries worldwide, covering the continents of Asia, Africa, Europe, America and Australia. PTV Global is available exclusively in the US on the Dish Network.
PTV is the most watched television network in Pakistan.

PTV-Global covers news and current affairs programming, including all facets of national politics, economy, current affairs, regional and international news, with a focus on the culture, art and music of Pakistan.

See also
PTV
Government of Pakistan
List of Pakistani television stations

External links
 Official site

International broadcasters
State media
Pakistan Television Corporation
Television stations in Islamabad
Urdu-language television stations in the United States
Urdu-language television channels in the United Kingdom